Danilovka is a rural locality (a village) in Lavrovskoye Rural Settlement, Sudogodsky District, Vladimir Oblast, Russia. The population was 1 as of 2010.

Geography 
Danilovka is located 32 km north of Sudogda (the district's administrative centre) by road. Spas-Kupalishche is the nearest rural locality.

References 

Rural localities in Sudogodsky District
Sudogodsky Uyezd